There are numerous regular sound correspondences between Hungarian and the other Uralic languages. For example, Hungarian á corresponds to Khanty o in certain positions, and Hungarian h corresponds to Khanty x, while Hungarian final z corresponds to Khanty final t. These can be seen in Hungarian ház ("house") and Khanty xot ("house"), or Hungarian száz ("hundred") and Khanty sot ("hundred").

Hungarian and Khanty are closely connected, either genealogically or as part of a language area. The distance between Hungarian and the Finnic languages is greater, but the correspondences are also regular. The relationship is most apparent when comparing all Uralic languages together, for then individual idiosyncrasies are averaged out, but in this article Hungarian is only compared with Finnish and Estonian (two Finnic languages).

Stop consonants

Word-initially
One important innovation of Hungarian is the lenition of the stop consonants *p *k in initial position.

Hungarian  corresponds to Finnish and Estonian  (compare English fish to Italian pesce):

Before front vowels (e é i í y ä ö ő ü ű), Hungarian  corresponds to Finnish and Estonian :

Before back vowels (a á o ó u ú), Hungarian  corresponds to Finnish and Estonian  (as English  in hound corresponds to Latin  in canis)

The third stop inherited from Proto-Uralic, *t, did not undergo such a change.
Hungarian initial  corresponds to Finnish and Estonian :

Word-medially

In the middle of words (note that due to the loss of the word final vocals in the Old Hungarian period these are now at the end of the words), Hungarian has also lenited original stops, but in a different fashion.

 Hungarian  correspond to Finnish and Estonian geminate stops :

 Hungarian  corresponds to the Finnish and Estonian two-stop cluster :

(No examples where a word with original *tt would have survived in both Hungarian and Finnic are known, but cases testifying for the development of *tt to /tt/ in Finnic and /t/ in Hungarian can be set up with the help of the other Uralic languages.)

 Hungarian  corresponds to Finnish and Estonian  (which may alternate with ):

(Again, with the help of the other Uralic languages, the analogous developments *mp *ŋk → Hungarian /b g/, Finnic /mp ŋk/ could be supported.)

 Hungarian  corresponds to Finnish and Estonian :

 Hungarian zero, here always preceding a long vowel, corresponds to Finnish and Estonian  by itself  (which may alternate with zero or /h/) and as the first member of a consonant cluster:

Sibilant consonants
Two different regular correspondences can be found in Hungarian for Finnish and Estonian . The first is Hungarian :

The second is Hungarian zero:

These two correspondences represent two different original consonants.  :  is reconstructed as originating in Proto-Uralic *ś, while ∅ :  is reconstructed as Proto-Uralic *s. Both correspondences can be seen simultaneously in the word for "autumn" (see above under *-k-), from Proto-Uralic *sükśi.

Sonorant consonants
 Hungarian liquid consonants  correspond to Finnish and Estonian :

Examples also include 'bit', 'to fear', 'cloud', 'fish', 'winter', 'flat', 'to push', 'bosom' listed above.

 Hungarian nasal consonants  correspond to Finnish and Estonian :

Further examples include 'honey', 'liver', 'eye', 'to plait', 'to see', 'sinew', 'tear', 'palate', 'arrow', 'to lick' listed above. Word-internally a correspondence Hungarian  : Finnic  is also found, as seen in 'broth', 'name', and 'heart'.

 A correspondence can also be set up between Hungarian  and Finnish and Estonian long vowels. With the help of the other Uralic languages, this can be reconstructed as *ŋ:

See also
Selected cognates in the Uralic languages
Common vocabulary among Finno-Ugric languages
The living fish swims in water

External links
Finnish–Hungarian etymologies

Hungarian language
Language comparison